Another Me (also known as ) is a 2022 Chinese comedy film produced by New Classics Media. It was released on 1 January 2022 and stars Ma Li, and Wei Xiang (魏翔).

Premise 
The film depicts a constable (捕快) named Li Mao who is married to Yang Jiazhen, a woman from a rich family, who unexpectedly discovers that he is the spitting image of the crown prince. Li Mao wants to go to the imperial palace to get a promotion, while the crown prince wishes to leave the palace and live freely. As a result, the two switch identities, but are drawn into the schemes of high officials.

Cast 
 Ma Li
 
 
 Wei Xiang (魏翔)
 Wang Chengsi (王成思)
 Du Xiaoyu (杜晓宇)

Release 

The film was originally scheduled for release on 31 December 2021, but this was pushed back to 1 January 2022.

Reception 

Derek Elley wrote that though enjoyable, the film falls short of its potential as it "relies on pratfall comedy, wordplay, and cameo appearances...rather than a plot with real character development and architecture."

References 

2022 films
Chinese comedy films
2022 comedy films